Simon Rosenberg (born October 23, 1963) is the founder of New Democrat Network and the New Policy Institute, a liberal think tank and advocacy group based in Washington, D.C.

Background

Rosenberg was born on October 23, 1963, in New York City to Peter and Louise Rosenberg. He attended the Walden School (New York City) and then public schools in Wilton, Connecticut.  He is a 1981 graduate of Wilton High School, and a 1985 graduate of Tufts University. In 1985 he moved to New York City to work for ABC News, where he spent two years before joining the Dukakis for President Campaign in Des Moines, Iowa. After Dukakis’ loss in 1988, he moved back to New York to work as a writer/producer for Linda Ellerbee’s Lucky Duck Productions. He left Lucky Duck in late 1991 to join the early Bill Clinton for President campaign in New Hampshire. He went on to play a major role in the general election campaign, serving in the famous War Room. In 1993 he moved from Little Rock, Arkansas to Washington, DC to work at the Democratic National Committee. He left the DNC in the fall of 1993 to join the Democratic Leadership Council, where he worked until starting the New Democrat Network in 1996. The New Democrat Network ceased operating in late 2004 and evolved into NDN and the New Policy Institute, the organization Rosenberg runs today.

In 1993, Rosenberg oversaw the placement of the first American political party on the Internet, putting the DNC on Compuserve. Rosenberg helped found the Congressional Caucus the New Democrat Coalition in 1996. A project he founded and led from 2003 through 2005 eventually became The Democracy Alliance. Rosenberg was a member of the Democratic Platform Committee in 2004, and a leading candidate for Chair of the Democratic National Committee in 2005. He was a high level outside advisor to the Obama White House and Administration more broadly, working on issues from TPP to Immigration Reform to economic policy.

Rosenberg is on the Board of the Jonathan M. Tisch College of Civic Life at Tufts University. In the fall of 2016 Rosenberg was a senior fellow at Tisch, teaching a class for undergraduates on American politics. Rosenberg is a member of the Department of State's Advisory Committee on International Communications and Information Policy (ACICIP). Rosenberg is an Advisory Board Member of the non-partisan Open Source Election Technology (OSET) Foundation. Rosenberg was a member of the 2001 Class of Henry Crown Fellows at the Aspen Institute and remains active in the Fellowship today.

He and his wife, Caitlin Durkovich, and their three children live in Washington, DC. He has five siblings – Robert McLoughlin, Jeannie Eastright, Michael McLouglin, Thomas McLoughlin and Nick Rosenberg – who live in the greater New York area. Both his parents, Peter and Louise, are deceased.

NDN and the New Policy Institute
Having founded the New Democrat Network in 1996, he currently serves as president of NDN, which has become committed to modernizing left-wing politics and building a persistent Democratic majority. The NDN eschews political orthodoxy when promoting candidates. Additionally, the NDN claims that it uses a more technologically modern and grassroots participatory approach to its activities than the DLC. Rosenberg is a member of the Aspen Institute’s 2001 Class of Henry Crown Fellows and served on the 2004 Democratic National Convention Platform Committee. Rosenberg has worked on the ground to help elect Democrats in 12 states across the country.

Rosenberg has become known for his focus on modernizing and developing the party's organization and communications infrastructure, especially through the use of new technologies such as the internet. He now sees NDN as a "non-denominational progressive" organization, focused on helping all Democrats be effective politically.

Rosenberg ran in the 2005 election for Chair of the Democratic National Committee. Some progressive bloggers endorsed Rosenberg, and even some who supported Howard Dean for the post of DNC chair, were friendly towards Rosenberg's candidacy. His bid for DNC chair was endorsed by Joe Trippi, Mike McCurry, Chris Heinz, Rep. Adam Smith, and Rep. Artur Davis. Rosenberg ended his candidacy for the Democratic National Committee chairmanship on February 4, 2005. On February 12, Howard Dean was elected chairman.

To date, NDN and Rosenberg's political efforts for and within the US Democratic Party still enjoy the support of many of their initial backers and original supporters of his candidacy for DNC Chair.

References

External links
Simon's Twitter Profile
Simon's US News Column
Bio page on NDN website
Simon Rosenberg's blog

"The 50 Year Strategy: A New Progressive Era (No, Really!)"
"Wiring the Vast Left-Wing Conspiracy" by Matt Bai in the New York Times Magazine, July 25, 2004.

Living people
New York (state) Democrats
Tufts University alumni
Activists from New York City
Connecticut Democrats
1963 births
Henry Crown Fellows
Walden School (New York City) alumni
Wilton High School alumni